Richard Edmond Bennett (born 1946) is a professor of Church History and Doctrine at Brigham Young University (BYU).  Prior to joining the faculty of BYU Bennett was the head of the Department of Archives and Special Collections at the University of Manitoba from 1978 to 1997. Bennett has served as president of the Mormon History Association.

Bennett is a native of Sudbury, Ontario, Canada.  He served a mission for the Church of Jesus Christ of Latter-day Saints (LDS Church) in Texas from 1967 to 1969. He has a master's degree from BYU where he wrote his thesis on early 19th-century missionary activities of The Church of Jesus Christ of Latter-day Saints in Ontario. Bennett has a Ph.D. in United States intellectual history from Wayne State University.  He is currently the Church History Editor for BYU Studies and was previously Associate Editor of the Journal of Book of Mormon Studies.

Bennett is the author of The Nauvoo Legion in Illinois: A History of the Mormon Militia, 1841–1846, We'll Find the Place: The Mormon Exodus, 1846-1848, and Mormons at the Missouri: 1846-1852.

In The Church of Jesus Christ of Latter-day Saints, Bennett has served as president of the Winnipeg Manitoba Stake starting in 1987. He served a mission for the church in Texas. In 2020 Bennett and his wife were called as directors of the church's historic site at Winter Quarters, Nebraska.

Bennett and his wife, the former Patricia Dyer, are the parents of five children.

Notes

Sources
BYU faculty bio 
University of Manitoba bio

External links 
 
 Maxwell Institute listing of Bennett

1946 births
20th-century Mormon missionaries
Brigham Young University faculty
Canadian leaders of the Church of Jesus Christ of Latter-day Saints
Canadian Mormon missionaries in the United States
Editors of Latter Day Saint publications
Historians of the Latter Day Saint movement
Canadian Latter Day Saint writers
Living people
Wayne State University alumni
Writers from Greater Sudbury
20th-century Canadian historians
Canadian male non-fiction writers
Academic staff of the University of Manitoba
Canadian expatriate academics in the United States
21st-century Canadian historians